Beta-adrenergic agonists, or  β-agonists, are non-hormonal growth promotants that help animals put on muscle instead of fat. The more scientifically accepted name for agents of this class is a repartitioning agent, not a growth promotor. Ractopamine (brand names include Optaflexx and Paylean) and zilpaterol (brand name Zilmax) received FDA approval in 1999 and 2003, respectively. They are also approved in Mexico, South Africa, and Canada. 160 countries restrict the importation of beef which has been raised with β-agonists. Temple Grandin was one of the first to describe the potential problems with the supplement. Cattle may arrive at the plant with a stiff gait, acting like they have both stiff muscles and sore feet. The problem could be muscle fatigue. Zilpateral enhances the growth of "fast-twitch" fibers, a type of muscle fiber that fatigues more easily. On August 16, 2013 Merck & Co., the makers of Zilmax, suspended the sale of the product in the US and Canada. But problems may exist with all β-agonists supplementation, and not just for animals.

Introduction
The family of β-agonists includes β1-, β2-, and β3-agonists such as clenbuterol, ractopamine, cimaterol, zilpaterol and salbutamol. They possess similar chemical structures with different substituent groups on the phenylethanolamines. Due to their significant nutrition redistribution function, β-agonists have been applied in the livestock industry such as pigs and ruminants to reduce carcass fat and increase muscle mass while improving growth rate and feed conversion ratio (Bareille and Faverdin, 1996, Bergen et al., 1989, Byrem et al., 1998, Cardoso and Taveira, 2002, Shook et al., 2009 and Williams et al., 1987). Unfortunately, β-agonists deposited in animal tissues can cause acute poisoning when consumed by humans, particularly in people with symptoms of muscular tremors, cardiac palpitation, nervousness, headache, muscular pain, dizziness, nausea, vomiting, fever and chills (Brambilla et al., 2000). Therefore, the use of β-agonists in animal feeds has been banned in many countries such as the EU and China (Mitchell and Dunnavan, 1998 and Prezelj et al., 2003). There are still illicit usages of β-agonists in animal feeds in many countries.

Screening
Broad screening and identification of β-agonists in feed, serum, urine, muscle and liver samples was achieved in a quick and highly sensitive manner using ultra high performance liquid chromatography-quadrupole-orbitrap high resolution mass spectrometry (UHPLC-Q-Orbitrap HRMS) combined with a spectra library search. Solid-phase extraction technology was employed for sample purification and enrichment. After extraction and purification, the samples were analyzed using a Q-Orbitrap high-resolution mass spectrometer under full-scan and data-dependent MS/MS mode. The acquired mass spectra were compared with an in-house library (compound library and MS/MS mass spectral library) built with TraceFinder Software which contained the M/Z of the precursor ion, chemical formula, retention time, character fragment ions and the entire MS/MS spectra of 32 β-agonist standards. Screening was achieved by comparing 5 key mass spectral results and positive matches were marked. Using the developed method, the identification results from 10 spiked samples and 238 actual samples indicated that only 2% of acquired mass spectra produced false identities. The method validation results showed that the limit of detection ranged from 0.021–3.854 μg kg−1 and 0.015–1.198 ng mL−1 for solid and liquid samples, respectively.

References

Beta-adrenergic agonists
Livestock